Desert Pursuit is a 1952 American Western film directed by George Blair and starring Wayne Morris, Virginia Grey and George Tobias. The film is based on the story "Horse Thieves' Hosanna" by Kenneth Perkins, originally published in the December 1948 issue of Blue Book. IMDb and other sources credit the screenplay to a novel called "Starlight Canyon." However, Perkins never published a novel under that title. Among his papers at the Bancroft Library is a typescript story titled "Starlight Canyon" with a handwritten note identifying the title under which it was published.

Cast
 Wayne Morris as Ford Smith 
 Virginia Grey as Mary Smith 
 George Tobias as Ghazili 
 Anthony Caruso as Hassan 
 Emmett Lynn as Leatherface Bates 
 John Doucette as Kafan 
 Robert Bice as Tomaso 
 Frank Lackteen as Ceremony Leader 
 Artie Ortego as Indian 
 Gloria Talbott as Indian Girl 
 William Wilkerson as Indian Bodyguard

References

External links
 
 Kenneth Perkins Papers, The Bancroft Library, University of California, Berkeley

1952 films
1952 Western (genre) films
American Western (genre) films
Films directed by George Blair
Monogram Pictures films
American black-and-white films
1950s English-language films
1950s American films